Stranger than Fiction is a 2006 American fantasy comedy-drama film directed by Marc Forster, produced by Lindsay Doran, and written by Zach Helm. The film stars Will Ferrell, Maggie Gyllenhaal, Dustin Hoffman, Queen Latifah, and Emma Thompson. The main plot follows Harold Crick (Ferrell), an IRS agent who begins hearing a disembodied voice narrating his life as it happens – seemingly the text of a novel in which it is stated that he, the main character, will soon die – and he frantically seeks to somehow prevent that ending. The film was shot on location in Chicago, and has been praised for its innovative, intelligent story and fine performances. Ferrell, who came to prominence playing brash comedic parts, garnered particular attention for offering a restrained performance in his first starring dramatic role.

Stranger than Fiction was released by Columbia Pictures on November 10, 2006. Upon release, the film received positive reviews mainly for its themes, humor, and performances.

Plot
Harold Crick is an Internal Revenue Service (IRS) agent living a solitary life of strictly scheduled routine. On the day he is assigned to audit an intentionally tax-delinquent baker named Ana Pascal, Harold begins hearing the voice of a woman narrating his life. When his wristwatch stops working and he resets it using the time from a bystander, the voice narrates that this action will eventually result in Harold's death. 

Harold consults a psychiatrist who suggests he see a literary expert if he believes there is a narrator. He visits literature professor Jules Hilbert, who initially dismisses him. However, he recognizes omniscient narrative devices in what Harold claims the voice said, and is intrigued. He tries to help Harold identify the author and determine if his story is a comedy or tragedy.

As Harold audits Ana he develops an attraction to her, but when he obliviously rejects a gift of cookies because it could be considered a bribe, he takes it as a sign he is in a tragedy. Jules tells Harold to spend the day at home doing nothing, and his living room is destroyed by a demolition crew that went to the wrong building. Jules takes such an improbable occurrence as proof that Harold is no longer in control of his own life, and advises he enjoy the time he has left, accepting whatever destiny the narrator has for him. 

Harold takes time off work, takes guitar lessons, moves in with his co-worker Dave, and starts dating Ana. Since she loves him, he re-evaluates his story as a comedy. While meeting with Jules, Harold sees a television interview with author Karen Eiffel and recognizes her voice as his narrator's. 

Jules, an admirer of Karen's work, says that all of her books are tragedies: the protagonist always dies. Karen has been struggling with writer's block on her next book because she cannot figure out how to kill Harold Crick, but has had a breakthrough and begun writing again.

Harold telephones Karen and stuns her by accurately recounting her book to her. They meet in person and she explains she has outlined the conclusion but not yet typed it in full. Her assistant, Penny, recommends Harold read the outline, but he cannot bring himself to do so, and gives it to Jules. Jules deems it Karen's masterpiece to which Harold's death is integral, and he consoles Harold that death is inevitable, but this death will hold a deeper meaning. 

Harold reads the outline and returns it to Karen, telling her the death she has written for him is beautiful and he accepts it. He takes care of some errands and spends his last night with Ana. The next morning Harold goes about his routine again as Karen writes and narrates. 

Karen reveals that when Harold reset his wristwatch, the bystander's time was three minutes fast, so he has reached the bus stop early. A boy riding a bicycle falls in front of the bus; Harold runs into the street to save him, and is hit himself. However, Karen, traumatized by the idea that she unwittingly narrated real people to their deaths, cannot bring herself to finish the sentence declaring him dead.

Harold wakes up in a hospital, and learns that shrapnel from his wristwatch – which was destroyed in the collision – blocked his ulnar artery and saved him from bleeding to death. Karen meets Jules and offers him a revised ending, and he finds the new ending weakens the book.

Karen replies the book was about a man who did not know he was going to die, but if Harold knew and accepted his fate, he is the kind of person who deserves to live. Karen's narration closes the film over a montage of Harold's newly invigorated life, ending on the ruined wristwatch that saved his life.

Cast
 Will Ferrell as Harold Crick, an IRS agent who starts hearing Eiffel's voice narrating his life.
 Maggie Gyllenhaal as Ana Pascal, a baker who is being audited by Crick and begins to fall in love with him.
 Emma Thompson as Karen Eiffel, an author known for killing the protagonists in her novels, but has been suffering from writer's block.
 Dustin Hoffman as Professor Jules Hilbert, a literature expert advising Crick.
 Queen Latifah as Penny Escher, an assistant who helps authors finish their works.
 Tony Hale as Dave, Crick's friend from his work.
 Tom Hulce as Dr. Cayly
 Linda Hunt as Dr. Mittag-Leffler, a psychologist whom Crick sees in hopes of solving his narration problem.
 Kristin Chenoweth as Book Channel Host

Production

Writing
In 2001, writer Zach Helm was working with producer Clarence Helmus on a project they called "The Disassociate". Helm came to Doran with a new idea involving a man who finds himself accompanied by a narrator that only he can hear. Helm next decided that the narrator should state that the man is going to die because, as Helm described, "there's something very poetic about the understanding of one's place in the universe, but it's far more dramatic when such understanding occurs only days before that life ends." Helm and Doran began referring to the new project as "The Narrator Project" and developed the story through a process of Helm's bringing ideas and Doran's asking questions. One of Helm's main ideas involved engaging the movie's form as much as its content.

Helm named each of the film's chief characters after a famous scientist or scientifically influential artist, examples including Crick, Pascal, Eiffel, Escher, and Hilbert. When the character of Dr. Hilbert tells Harold that he has devised a series of 23 questions in order to investigate the narrator, it is a playful reference to Hilbert's 23 problems. The film's title derives from a quote by Lord Byron: "Tis strange—but true; for truth is always strange, Stranger than fiction".

According to Helm, one of the film's major themes is of interconnectivity. Helm stated "Each of these characters ends up doing little things to save one another. There's an underlying theme that the things we take most for granted are often the ones that make life worth living and actually keep us alive."

Photography
The film was shot on location in Chicago, Illinois. Dave's apartment, in which Harold takes residence after his own building partially is demolished, is part of the River City Condominiums. Hilbert's office was in a lecture hall at the University of Illinois at Chicago. The CNA Center at 333 South Wabash Avenue in the Loop served as the location for the IRS office. The bakery that Ana Pascal runs is located in the Little Village neighborhood of Chicago and is called La Catedral Cafe & Restaurant. The movie theatre in the film is the Logan Theatre located in the Logan Square neighborhood. Many downtown Chicago locations were used for scenes involving Karen Eiffel, Penny Escher, and Harold Crick. Columbia Pictures distributed the film.

The film partly was inspired by Playtime (1967), Jacques Tati's visionary comedy about modern urban life, and the cinematography and production design help create a claustrophobic sense of life in the city.

Music

The music for this film includes original scores by the collaborative effort of Britt Daniel (singer/songwriter of Spoon) and Brian Reitzell (composer for Friday Night Lights, The Bling Ring and Hannibal), as well as a mix of indie rock songs from various artists including Spoon. Reitzell is also the film's music supervisor. The soundtrack includes an original recording of "Whole Wide World", the song that Harold plays for Ana, by Wreckless Eric.

Release
Stranger than Fiction was released in the United States on November 10, 2006.  It opened at #4 in the box office behind Borat, The Santa Clause 3: The Escape Clause, and Flushed Away and grossed $13.4 million in 2,264 theaters. Its widest release was 2,270 theaters, across which it grossed $40.7 million. Outside the US, it grossed another $13 million, for a worldwide total of $53.6 million.

Reception
On Rotten Tomatoes, the film holds a 73% approval rating based on 175 reviews; the average rating is 6.87/10. The site's critical consensus reads, "A fun, whimsical tale about an office drone trying to save his life from his narrator, Stranger Than Fiction features a subdued performance from Will Ferrell that contributes mightily to its quirky, mind-bending effect." On Metacritic, the film holds a score of 67 out of 100 based on 35 critics, indicating "generally favorable reviews". Audiences polled by CinemaScore gave the film an average grade of "B+" on an A+ to F scale.

Roger Ebert gave it 3.5 out of 4 stars, stating that the film was thought-provoking and moral, and that "Such an uncommonly intelligent film does not often get made...which requires us to enter the lives of these specific quiet, sweet, worthy people", and he also praised Ferrell's performance saying, "Will Ferrell stars, in another role showing that like Steve Martin and Robin Williams he has dramatic gifts to equal his comedic talent".

Rolling Stone rated the film 3 out of 4 stars, stating that though the premise of Ferrell's life being narrated is a set-up for farce, the film is "less self-reflexively clever and more intimate". Todd McCarthy in Variety positively reviewed the film, praising its invention and Ferrell's performance as nuanced: first playing a tight focused caricature of the company man, then exercising more humanity and wit without being "goofy".

Accolades

See also
 Metafiction

References

External links

 

2006 films
2000s fantasy comedy-drama films
American fantasy comedy-drama films
Films about writers
Films shot in Chicago
Self-reflexive films
Columbia Pictures films
Mandate Pictures films
Films directed by Marc Forster
Films set in Chicago
Magic realism films
Metafictional works
2000s English-language films
2000s American films